The  Great Western Railway (GWR) GWR 5100 Class (known as the 3100 class between 1912 and 1927) was a class of 2-6-2T side tank steam locomotives. It was the first of a series of broadly similar classes used principally for suburban passenger services.

History

The class was developed from one of George Jackson Churchward's pioneer designs – No 99 – and a number of derivative classes were built from 1906 to 1950. The development is somewhat convoluted to follow, because of various renumberings and gaps in the number series as listed below.

No. 99 was built in 1903 and given an extended trial over the ensuing two years. This production batch differed from the prototype only in that the tank tops were sloping to aid visibility and the cab sides were incorporated into the tanks. The running numbers of this batch were 3111 to 3149 and the prototype was renumbered 3100 in 1912. They received enlarged coal bunkers. In 1927, after some improvements to weight distribution, the class was renumbered 5100 and 5111 to 5149. 

None of the 5100 class have been preserved.

Developments of the 3100/5100 Class 
The  3150 Class was a 1906 version of the 3100, fitted with the larger and heavier Standard 4 boiler. They were numbered from 3150 to 3190.

The  5101 Class were fundamentally Collett versions of the 5100 class, built from 1929 to 1949 with the Standard 2 boiler. They were numbered 5101–5110, 5150–5199 and 4100–4179.

The 1931  6100 Class were more powerful versions of the 5101, fitted with a version of the Standard 2 boiler with higher working pressure, giving the locomotives greater tractive effort. They were numbered 6100–6169.

The  Collett 3100 Class were members of the 3150 class, rebuilt in 1938/39 with smaller driving wheels. They retained the larger Standard 4 boiler from the 3150s and were numbered 3100–3104.

The 8100 Class (see below) were members of the 5100 class rebuilt in 1938/39 with smaller driving wheels and the same higher pressure version of the Standard 2 boiler as the 6100 class. They were numbered 8100–8109.

8100 class
 
In 1938/39 ten members of the 5100 series were rebuilt with  driving wheels and 3-foot pony truck wheels. They retained the number 2 boiler, but again pressed to 225 psi as in the 6100. Numbers 5100 (the original 1903 prototype number 99 now being renumbered for the third time), 5123, 5118, 5145, 5124, 5126, 5120, 5116, 5133 and 5115, were renumbered 8100 to 8109. This 8100 class were intended to bolster the 6100 class on London suburban duties, with the smaller driving wheels giving a supposed benefit of better acceleration. Whatever the practical advantage in performance, the class became widely dispersed and locos were used alongside their predecessors indiscriminately. 

None of the 8100 class have been preserved.

GWR Prairies
The 2-6-2 wheel arrangement is nicknamed "Prairie". The Churchward 3100/5100, 3150, 5101, Collett 3100, 6100 and 8100  classes are collectively  nicknamed "Large Prairies" while the smaller 4400, 4500 and 4575 classes are known as "Small Prairies".

See also
GWR 3150 Class
GWR 5101 Class
GWR 6100 Class
 GWR 3100 Class (1938)
List of GWR standard classes with two outside cylinders

References

Champ, Jim (2018). An introduction to great western locomotive development. PEN & SWORD TRANSPORT. ISBN 978-1-4738-7784-9

5100
2-6-2T locomotives
Standard gauge steam locomotives of Great Britain
Railway locomotives introduced in 1903
Scrapped locomotives
Passenger locomotives